Mir (which is derived from the Arabic title Emir 'general, prince') is a rare ruler's title in princely states and an aristocratic title generally used to refer to a person who is a descendant of a commander in medieval Muslim tradition.

It was adopted in many languages under Islamic influence, such as Mir is a Balochi word and all the rest of the tribes copy this word and Sardar also came from the Balochs, later it became popular in Pakistan.

According to the book Persian Inscriptions on Indian Monuments, Mir is most probably an Arabized form of Pir. Pir  in Old Persian means "the old", "the wise man", "the chief" and "the great leader." Pir is a religious cleric's or leader's title for Alevi, Yezidism and Yarsanism faith meaning old and wise spiritual leader. Amir, meaning "lord" or "commander-in-chief", is derived from the Arabic root a-m-r, "command".

Title

Ruling Princes 
In Muslim princely states of British India, few rulers were formally styled Mir, notably in present Pakistan, where only two of the six have actually reached the level of salute state, becoming entitled to a gun salute and the attached form of address His Highness:
 the Mir of Morni , Garhi Kotaha and Pindrawal part of then Punjab Province and United Province. British India now Punjab , Haryana and some parts of Uttar Pradesh India
 the Mir of Khayrpur (Khairpur) (17 guns), a Rajputana part of present Pakistan's Sindh province, under a branch of the Talpur clan

 the Mir of Hunza (15 guns)

The following all remained non-salute states:

 The Mir of Mirpur State, under a branch of the above Talpur clan, in Sind(h)
 The Mir of Kharan; from 1921, restyled Sardar Bahador Nawab, till 1940 a vassal of the Khan and Wali of Khalat (the senior ruler in British/Pakistani Baluchistan)
 Petty Pashtun Northwestern Frontier states
 The Mir of Amb (Tanawal), capital Darband; from 1868, restyled Nawwab; from 1921 promoted Nawab Bahador
 The Mir of Nagar, in the northern part of Gilgit–Baltistan.
 The Mir of Jandala State, a petty Rajput North Frontier state

Mir was also used as an honor rank. (See: Mirza)

Compound Titles 
In the subcontinent, since the Mughal period, various compounds were used in Persian including:
 combined Indian princely styles, notably Sahibzada Mir
Mīr-tuzak or tǒzak: Marshal, in the sense of an officer who maintains order in a march or procession; master of the ceremonies
Mīr-dah or Mīr-daha: Commander or superintendent of ten: decurion; a Tithingman
Mīr-sāmān: Head steward
Mīr-shikār: Master of the hunt, chief huntsman; also Grand Falconer; hence bird-catcher, and (metaphorically) a pimp
Mīr-ě-ātash or Mīr-ātish: Chief of the fireworks; also Commandant of artillery, Master of the ordnance
Mīr-ě-majlis, shortened Mīr-majlis: Master of the ceremonies or president, chairman of a majlis (assembly)
Mīr-mahalla: Headman of a mahal(la), i.e. quarter (of a town)
Mīr-ě-manzil, shortened Mīr-manzil: Overseer of the halting-places; Quartermaster-general
Mīr-munshī: Chief secretary; Head (native) clerk of a (colonial) office.
'Mir-Hashimi: leader in logar province of Afghanistan ( Mir Samim Hashimi)
In the Hindu kingdom of Nepal:

Mir Munshi, from the Arabic Amir-i-Munshi, 'commander of the secretaries', is the Chief Secretary of the Foreign Office.
Mir Umrao, from the Arabic Amir ul-Umara, 'commander of commanders': a senior military officer ranking below a Sardar and charged with the command of a fort and surrounding territories, the training and equipment of soldiers and the supply of material.

In the Baloch kingdom of Balochistan:

Mir Chakar Rind, Ruler of Balochistan in the 15th century.

In the Ottoman Empire, Mir-i Miran was used as the Persian equivalent to the Turkish title Beylerbey ("Bey of Beys"), alongside the Arabic equivalent Amir al-Umara ("Emir of Emirs").

In the Yazidi culture, the Mîr is the religious and also the administrative authority.

See also 
 There are several cities and towns in Pakistan named after this princely title. These include Mirpur, in Kashmir, and Mirpurkhas, in Sindh.
Mir Ali Ayyubi
 In the tribal societies of South Asia, many people used this word with or as rather as part of their names e.g. Mir Murtaza Bhutto, as happens with many titles (especially Khan), not only those holding a position as tribal or other leader.
 Mir is a prominent family name among people of Kashmiri origin in Punjab province of Pakistan.
 Amir (later Amir Nawwab) of Bahawalpur)

References

External links
 Platt's Dictionary of Urdu&Hindi

Court titles
Feudalism in Asia
Heads of state
Military ranks
Royal titles
Noble titles
Titles
Titles in Pakistan
Islam in South Asia
Titles in Bangladesh